Profanter is a surname. Notable people with the surname include:

Susanne Profanter (born 1970), Austrian judoka
Ursula Profanter (born 1968), Austrian sprint canoer and marathon canoeist

German-language surnames
Surnames of Austrian origin
Surnames of South Tyrolean origin